The 2020 Louisiana–Monroe Warhawks football team represented the University of Louisiana at Monroe in the 2020 NCAA Division I FBS football season. The Warhawks played their home games at Malone Stadium in Monroe, Louisiana, and competed in the West Division of the Sun Belt Conference. They were led by fifth-year head coach Matt Viator. After the team played to an 0–10 record (0–7 in conference play), Viator was fired on December 7.

Previous season
The Warhawks finished the 2019 season 5–7, 4–4 in Sun Belt play to finish in third place in the West Division for the second consecutive year in the Sun Belt Conference. The Warhawks were not invited to any other postseason games.

Preseason

Recruiting class

|}

Award watch lists
Listed in the order that they were released

Sun Belt coaches' poll
The Sun Belt coaches poll was released on August 25, 2020. Louisiana–Monroe was picked to finish 5th in the West Division with 20 total votes.

Preseason All-Sun Belt teams
The Warhawks had four players selected to the preseason All−Sun Belt teams; three from the offense and one from the defense.

Offense

1st team

Josh Johnson – R-SR, Running Back
Josh Pederson – R-SR, Tight End

2nd team

T.J. Fiailoa – R-SR, Offensive Line

Defense

1st team

Corey Straughter – SR, Defensive Back

Schedule
Louisiana–Monroe will play host to conference foes Texas State, Georgia Southern, Appalachian State, and Louisiana.  They will travel to Troy, South Alabama, Georgia State, and Arkansas State

Louisiana-Monroe had games against Arkansas, Cal Poly, and Georgia, which were canceled due to the COVID-19 pandemic.
 

Schedule Source:

Game summaries

at Army

Texas State

UTEP

Georgia Southern

at Liberty

at South Alabama

Appalachian State

at Georgia State

Louisiana

References

Louisiana–Monroe
Louisiana–Monroe Warhawks football seasons
College football winless seasons
Louisiana–Monroe Warhawks football